Aldehyde dehydrogenase 16 family, member A1 also known as ALDH16A1 is an aldehyde dehydrogenase gene.

Clinical significance 

Mutations in the SPG21 (ACP33/maspardin) gene are associated with the mast syndrome, a type of spastic paraplegia. The protein encoded by the SPG21 gene has been shown to interact with the ALDH16A1 enzyme.

References

External links

Further reading